Eois ambarilla is a moth in the family Geometridae. It is found in southern Ecuador.

References

Moths described in 1893
Eois